Oberea morio is a species of beetle in the family Cerambycidae. It was described by Kraatz in 1879. It is known from China, Russia and Mongolia.

References

Beetles described in 1879
morio